RFA Bayleaf (A79) was a Leaf-class  support tanker of the Royal Fleet Auxiliary, and the second ship to bear the name.

Bayleaf was launched by the Furness Shipbuilding Company of Stockton-on-Tees. She was launched as the civilian London Integrity for London & Overseas Freighters in 1954 and completed in 1955. She was a sister ship of RFA Brambleleaf (A81) built by the same shipyard for LOF the previous year.

She was bareboat chartered for the RFA in 1959 and renamed RFA Bayleaf. She was returned to her owners in 1973, with whom she traded as the London Integrity again until the end of 1976.

On 7 January 1977 she was sold for scrap and on 25 January 1977 she arrived in Burriana in Spain to be broken up.

References

Sources and further reading

External links

1954 ships
Ships of London and Overseas Freighters
Leaf-class tankers
Ships built on the River Tees